Orchestra di Piazza Vittorio is a well-known Italian multi-ethnic orchestra that was created in Rome in 2002. It is also the subject of a 2006 film of the same name.

History
The Orchestra di Piazza Vittorio begins in the Esquilino neighborhood in Rome. This colorful and largely populated by immigrants area of Rome revolves around a square that is a hub for various cultures, sounds and musicians from all corners of the world: Piazza Vittorio Emanuele II, also known as Piazza Vittorio. This Piazza inspired musician Mario Tronco, of the Piccola Orchestra Avion Travel, and filmmaker Agostino Ferrente to reunite some of these extraordinary performers, each one unique in origin, instrument, and musical experience, in a group, or better an orchestra, that plays and reinvents music from all over the world with an energy that audiences take away with them after each concert.

The project was carried out through Apollo 11, a community organization founded in 2001 by Tronco, Ferrente, and other artists and volunteers with the goal of rescuing the Apollo, a vintage movie theater, from being turned into a bingo hall.

The documentary L'Orchestra di Piazza Vittorio (2006) by Agostino Ferrente tells the story of this very unusual musical ensemble. The movie has since been successfully screened at many international festivals, including the Locarno International Film Festival in Switzerland and the Tribeca Film Festival in New York City. In Italy it is distributed by Luckyred, and has won several awards such as the Nastro d'Argento and the Globo D’Oro as best documentary, both in 2007. Netflix is the US distributor of the movie that has also been released in many other countries around the world. 

L’Orchestra di Piazza Vittorio has played over 300 concerts in the five continents, often after the screening of Ferrente’s movie, a format referred to as "cineconcerto" (film + concert).

The Orchestra has recorded five albums until now: the first (self-titled) has received the "German Record Critics' Award" in 2005 in the World Music section. The album Il Flauto Magico was co-produced by the legendary Bob Ezrin.

In the summer of 2009, the Orchestra di Piazza Vittorio made a tour in Europe with their rendition of Mozart’s The Magic Flute, which debuted in Lyon.

Orchestra members
Houcine Ataa (Tunisia) – vocals
Fausto Bottoni (Italy) – trombone, euphonium
Peppe D’Argenzio (Italy) – baritone and soprano sax, clarinet
Evandro Cesar Dos Reis (Brazil) – vocals, classical and electric guitar, cavaquinho
Sanjay Kansa Banik (India) – tabla
Awalys Ernesto “El Kiri” López Maturell (Cuba) – drums, congas
Omar López Valle (Cuba) – trumpet, flugelhorn
Zsuzsanna Krasznai (Hungary) – cello
John Maida (United States) – violin
Gaia Orsoni (Italy) – viola
Carlos Paz Duque (Ecuador) – vocals, Andean flute
Pino Pecorelli (Italy) – double bass, electric bass
Leandro Piccioni (Italy) – piano
El Hadji “Pap” Yeri Samb (Senegal) – vocals, djembe, dundun, sabar
Raúl “Cuervo” Scebba (Argentina) – marimba, congas, percussions, timpani
“Kaw” Dialy Mady Sissoko (Senegal) – vocals, kora
Ziad Trabelsi (Tunisia) – oud, vocals
Mario Tronco (Italy) – Fender Rhodes
with Sylvie Lewis (UK/USA) – vocals, guitar

Former members
Eszter Nagypal (Hungary) – cello
Giuseppe Smaldino (Italy) – french horn
Mohammed Bilal (India) – harmonium, castanets
Amrit Hussain (India) – tabla

Discography
 Studio albums:
L'Orchestra di Piazza Vittorio (2003)
Sona (2006)
L'Isola di Legno (2013)
Credo (2016)
Live albums
Il Flauto Magico Secondo L'Orchestra di Piazza Vittorio (2010)

References

External links
 Official website of the Orchestra di Piazza Vittorio
 MySpace profile for the Orchestra di Piazza Vittorio
 Images of the Orchestra on Flickr

Italian orchestras